David Reed may refer to:

Entertainment
 David Vern Reed (1924–1989), American comics writer
 David E. Reed (1927–1990), Reader's Digest editor
 David Reed (artist) (born 1946), American artist
 David Jay Reed (born 1950), artist
 David Reed (comedian) (born 1982), British actor and comedian
 Dave Reed, member of trance group Tritonal

Politics
 David C. Reed (1847–1938), mayor of San Diego, California
 David A. Reed (1880–1953), U.S. Senator from Pennsylvania, 1923–1935
 Dave L. Reed (born 1978), member of the Pennsylvania State House
 David Reed (politician) (1945–2017), British Labour Party Member of Parliament, 1970–1974

Religion
 David Reed (bishop) (born 1927), American Episcopal bishop
 David M. Reed (born 1957), American bishop

Sports
 David Reed (American football) (born 1987), American football player
 David Reed (soccer) (born 1988), American soccer player

Other
 David Reed (pioneer), American pioneer
 David P. Reed (born 1952), computer scientist, designer of user datagram protocol
 David Wellington Reed (1972–1985), American teenager whose murder was unsolved for 24 years

See also
Dave Reid (disambiguation)
David Reid (disambiguation)
David Read (disambiguation)